A canyon (from ; archaic British English spelling: cañon), or gorge, is a deep cleft between escarpments or cliffs resulting from weathering and the erosive activity of a river over geologic time scales. Rivers have a natural tendency to cut through underlying surfaces, eventually wearing away rock layers as sediments are removed downstream. A river bed will gradually reach a baseline elevation, which is the same elevation as the body of water into which the river drains. The processes of weathering and erosion will form canyons when the river's headwaters and estuary are at significantly different elevations, particularly through regions where softer rock layers are intermingled with harder layers more resistant to weathering.

A canyon may also refer to a rift between two mountain peaks, such as those in ranges including the Rocky Mountains, the Alps, the Himalayas or the Andes. Usually, a river or stream carves out such splits between mountains. Examples of mountain-type canyons are Provo Canyon in Utah or Yosemite Valley in California's Sierra Nevada. Canyons within mountains, or gorges that have an opening on only one side, are called box canyons. Slot canyons are very narrow canyons that often have smooth walls.

Steep-sided valleys in the seabed of the continental slope are referred to as submarine canyons. Unlike canyons on land, submarine canyons are thought to be formed by turbidity currents and landslides.

Etymology

The word canyon is Spanish in origin, with the same meaning. The word canyon is generally used in North America, while the words gorge and ravine (French in origin) are used in Europe and Oceania, though gorge and ravine are also used in some parts of North America. In the United States, place names generally use canyon in the southwest (due to their proximity to Spanish-speaking Mexico) and gorge in the northeast (which is closer to French Canada), with the rest of the country graduating between these two according to geography. In Canada, a gorge is usually narrow while a ravine is more open and often wooded. The military-derived word defile is occasionally used in the United Kingdom.

Formation

Most canyons were formed by a process of long-time erosion from a plateau or table-land level. The cliffs form because harder rock strata that are resistant to erosion and weathering remain exposed on the valley walls.

Canyons are much more common in arid areas than in wet areas because physical weathering has a more localized effect in arid zones. The wind and water from the river combine to erode and cut away less resistant materials such as shales. The freezing and expansion of water also serve to help form canyons. Water seeps into cracks between the rocks and freezes, pushing the rocks apart and eventually causing large chunks to break off the canyon walls, in a process known as frost wedging. Canyon walls are often formed of resistant sandstones or granite.

Sometimes large rivers run through canyons as the result of gradual geological uplift. These are called entrenched rivers, because they are unable to easily alter their course. In the United States, the Colorado River in the Southwest and the Snake River in the Northwest are two examples of tectonic uplift.

Canyons often form in areas of limestone rock. As limestone is soluble to a certain extent, cave systems form in the rock. When a cave system collapses, a canyon is left, as in the Mendip Hills in Somerset and Yorkshire Dales in Yorkshire, England.

Box canyon

A box canyon is a small canyon that is generally shorter and narrower than a river canyon, with steep walls on three sides, allowing access and egress only through the mouth of the canyon. Box canyons were frequently used in the western United States as convenient corrals, with their entrances fenced.

Largest canyons

The definition of "largest canyon" is imprecise, because a canyon can be large by its depth, its length, or the total area of the canyon system. Also, the inaccessibility of the major canyons in the Himalaya contributes to them not being regarded as candidates for the biggest canyon. The definition of "deepest canyon" is similarly imprecise, especially if one includes mountain canyons, as well as canyons cut through relatively flat plateaus (which have a somewhat well-defined rim elevation).

It is slightly longer than the Grand Canyon in the United States. Others consider the Kali Gandaki Gorge in midwest Nepal to be the deepest canyon, with a  difference between the level of the river and the peaks surrounding it.

Vying for the deepest canyon in the Americas is the Cotahuasi Canyon and Colca Canyon, in southern Peru.

It was among the 28 finalists of the New7Wonders of Nature worldwide poll. (Some referred to it as one of the seven natural wonders of the world.)

The largest canyon in Africa is the Fish River Canyon in Namibia.

In August 2013, the discovery of Greenland's Grand Canyon was reported, based on the analysis of data from Operation IceBridge. It is located under an ice sheet.

The Capertee Valley in Australia is commonly reported as being the second-widest canyon in the world.

Cultural significance
Some canyons have notable cultural significance. Evidence of early hominids has been discovered in Africa's Olduvai Gorge. In the southwestern United States, canyons are important archeologically because of the many cliff-dwellings built in such areas, largely by the ancient Pueblo people who were their first inhabitants.

Notable examples
The following list contains only the most notable canyons of the world, arranged by continent and then country.

Africa

Namibia
Fish River Canyon

South Africa
Blyde River Canyon, Mpumalanga
Oribi Gorge, KwaZulu-Natal

Tanzania
Olduvai Gorge

Americas

Argentina
Atuel Canyon, Mendoza Province

Brazil

Itaimbezinho Canyon, Rio Grande do Sul

Canada

Grand Canyon of the Stikine, British Columbia
Horseshoe Canyon, Alberta
Niagara Gorge, Ontario
Ouimet Canyon, Ontario

Colombia
Chicamocha Canyon, Santander Department

Mexico
Barranca de Oblatos, Jalisco
Copper Canyon, Chihuahua
Sumidero Canyon, Chiapas

Peru
Cañón del Pato, Ancash Region
Colca Canyon, Arequipa Region
Cotahuasi Canyon, Arequipa Region

United States

American Fork Canyon, Utah
Antelope Canyon, Arizona
Apple River Canyon, Illinois
Ausable Chasm, New York
Big Cottonwood Canyon, Utah
Black Canyon of the Gunnison, Colorado
Blackwater Canyon, West Virginia
Blue Creek Canyon, Colorado
Bluejohn Canyon, Utah
Box Canyon
Breaks Canyon, Kentucky and Virginia
Butterfield Canyon, Utah
Cane Creek, Alabama
Canyon de Chelly, Arizona
Canyonlands National Park, canyons of the Colorado River and its main tributary the Green River, Utah
Cheat Canyon, West Virginia
Clifton Gorge, Ohio
Clifty Creek Falls, Indiana
Cloudland Canyon, Georgia
Columbia River Gorge, Oregon and Washington
Conkle's Hollow, Ohio
Cottonwood Canyon, Utah
Crooked River Gorge, Oregon
Death Hollow, Utah 
Desolation Canyon, Utah
Dismals Canyon, Alabama
Flaming Gorge, Wyoming and Utah
Flume Gorge, New Hampshire
Glen Canyon, Utah and Arizona
Glenwood Canyon, Colorado
Gore Canyon, Colorado
Grand Canyon, Arizona
Grand Canyon of the Yellowstone, Wyoming
Grandstaff Canyon, Utah
Guffey Gorge, Colorado
Gulf Hagas, Maine
Hells Canyon, Idaho, Oregon, and Washington
Horse Canyon, Utah
Kern River Canyon, California
Kings Canyon, Utah
Kings Canyon, California
Leslie Gulch, Oregon
Linville Gorge, North Carolina
Little Cottonwood Canyon, Utah
Little Grand Canyon, Illinois
Little River Canyon, Alabama
Logan Canyon, Utah
Mather Gorge, Maryland
Marysvale Canyon, Utah
McCormick's Creek Canyon, Indiana
Millcreek Canyon, Utah
New River Gorge, West Virginia
Ninemile Canyon, Utah
Ogden Canyon, Utah
Oneonta Gorge, Oregon
Palo Duro Canyon, Texas
Parleys Canyon, Utah
Pine Creek Gorge, Pennsylvania
Poudre Canyon, Colorado
Providence Canyon, Georgia
Quechee Gorge, Vermont
Red River Gorge, Kentucky
Rio Grande Gorge, New Mexico
Royal Gorge, Colorado
Ruby Canyon, Utah
Snake River Canyon, Idaho
Snow Canyon, Utah
Stillwater Canyon, Utah
Tallulah Gorge, Georgia
Tennessee River Gorge, Alabama and Tennessee
The Trough, West Virginia
Unaweep Canyon, Colorado
Uncompahgre Gorge, Colorado
Waimea Canyon, Hawaii
Walls of Jericho, Alabama
Weber Canyon, Utah
Westwater Canyon, Utah
Wolverine Canyon, Utah
White Canyon, Utah
Zion Canyon, Utah

Asia

China
Three Gorges, Chongqing
Tiger Leaping Gorge, Yunnan
Yarlung Zangbo Grand Canyon, Tibet Autonomous Region

India
Gandikota, Kadapa District, Andhra Pradesh
Raneh Falls, Chatarpur district, Madhya Pradesh
Garadia Mahadev, Kota district, Rajasthan
Idukki, Western Ghats, Kerala

Indonesia
 Brown Canyon, Semarang, Central Java
 Cukang Taneuh, Pangandaran, West Java

Pakistan
 Indus River Gorge through the Himalaya

Taiwan
Taroko Gorge, Hualien County

Others
Afghanistan – Tang-e Gharu
Japan – Tenryū-kyō in Nagano Prefecture
Kazakhstan – Charyn Canyon
Nepal – Kali Gandaki Gorge
Russia – Delyun-Uran (Vitim River)
Turkey – Ihlara Valley in Aksaray Province

Europe

United Kingdom
Avon Gorge, Bristol
Burrington Combe, Somerset
Cheddar Gorge, Somerset
Corrieshalloch Gorge, Ullapool
Ebbor Gorge, Somerset
Gordale Scar, North Yorkshire
Winnats Pass, Derbyshire

France
Ardèche Gorges, Auvergne-Rhône-Alpes
Gorges de Daluis, Provence-Alpes-Côte d'Azur
Gorges du Tarn, Occitanie
Grands Goulets, Auvergne-Rhône-Alpes
Verdon Gorge, Alpes-de-Haute-Provence

Spain
Tagus River Gorge, Guadalajara Province
Gallo River Gorge, Guadalajara Province
Guadalope River Gorge, Teruel Province
Lobos River Gorge, Soria Province

Russia

Sulak Canyon, Dagestan

Ukraine

Aktove canyon
Buky Canyon
Dniester Canyon

Others
Albania – Osum Canyon
Bosnia and Herzegovina – Rakitnica, Drina, Neretva, Vrbas
Bulgaria – Trigrad Gorge, Kresna Gorge, Iskar Gorge
Finland – Korouoma Canyon
Germany – Partnach Gorge
Greece – Vikos Gorge, Samaria Gorge
Greenland – Greenland's Grand Canyon
Iceland – Fjaðrárgljúfur Canyon
Kosovo – Rugova Canyon, White Drin Canyon, Kacanik Gorge 
North Macedonia – Matka Canyon
Montenegro/Bosnia and Herzegovina – Tara River Canyon
Montenegro – Morača, Piva
Norway – Sautso Canyon
Poland/Slovakia – Dunajec River Gorge
Serbia/Romania - Iron Gates
Slovenia – Vintgar Gorge
Switzerland – Aare Gorge

Oceania

Australia
Joffre Gorge, Karijini National Park, Western Australia
Katherine Gorge, Northern Territory
Kings Canyon, Northern Territory
Murchison River Gorge, Western Australia
Jamison Valley, New South Wales
Capertee Valley, New South Wales – the world's second-widest canyon
Shoalhaven Gorge, New South Wales
Werribee Gorge, Victoria
The Slot Canyons of the Blue Mountains, New South Wales

New Zealand
Manawatu Gorge, North Island
Skippers Canyon, South Island

Canyons on other planetary bodies
Ithaca Chasma on Saturn's moon Tethys
Valles Marineris on Mars, the largest-known canyon in the Solar System
Vid Flumina on Saturn's largest moon Titan is the only known liquid-floored canyon in the Solar System besides Earth
Messina Chasmata on Uranus' moon Titania

Venus has many craters and canyons on its surface. The troughs on the planet are part of a system of canyons that is more than 6,400 km long.

See also

References

External links

 
Slope landforms